Synthesis Design + Architecture (also known as SDA), is an architecture and design firm based in Los Angeles, California led by Alvin Huang.

Awards
The firm was honored with the Presidential Emerging Practice of the Year Award by the American Institute of Architects Los Angeles Chapter in 2016. They also received the R+D Award from Architect Magazine in 2015, and was featured as a Next Progressive by Architect Magazine in 2014.

References

Architecture firms based in California
Year of establishment missing